A. Venkatesh Naik (6 June 1936 – 24 August 2015) was an Indian politician and a member of the Indian National Congress (INC) political party, with whom he had been a member for nearly 50 years. He was elected to the 10th Lok Sabha in 1991 from Raichur constituency in Karnataka. He was re-elected to the Lok Sabha in 1998, 1999 and 2004 from the same constituency. He secured a seat in the Karnataka legislative assembly elections of 2013 from Devdurga constituency. On 24 August 2015, Nayak was among 5 killed in a train accident in Andhra Pradesh.

References 

1936 births
2015 deaths
Indian National Congress politicians from Karnataka
India MPs 1991–1996
India MPs 1998–1999
India MPs 1999–2004
India MPs 2004–2009
People from Raichur district
Lok Sabha members from Karnataka
Railway accident deaths in India